Gregg Rudloff (November 2, 1955 – January 6, 2019) was an American re-recording mixer. He won three Academy Awards for Best Sound and was nominated for four more in the same category. He worked on 150 films from 1983 onwards. His father, Tex Rudloff, was a sound engineer who was nominated for an Academy Award in 1978. On January 6, 2019, Rudloff died at the age of 63 from a reported suicide.

Selected filmography
Rudloff won three Academy Awards for Best Sound and was nominated for four more:

Won
 Glory (1989)
 The Matrix (1999)
 Mad Max: Fury Road (2015)

Nominated
 The Perfect Storm (2000)
 Flags of Our Fathers (2006)
 Argo (2012)
 American Sniper (2014)

References

External links
 

1955 births
2019 deaths
American audio engineers
Best Sound Mixing Academy Award winners
Best Sound BAFTA Award winners
People from Los Angeles
Emmy Award winners
Engineers from California
Suicides in California
Re-recording mixers
2019 suicides